Hugh Henderson McCain (April 22, 1853 – June 1, 1920) was a produce dealer and political figure in New Brunswick, Canada. He represented Carleton County in the Legislative Assembly of New Brunswick from 1895 to 1903 as a Liberal member.

He was born in Florenceville, New Brunswick, of Irish descent, and educated there. McCain married Florence McPatrick.

References 

The Canadian parliamentary companion, 1897 JA Gemmill

1853 births
1920 deaths
New Brunswick Liberal Association MLAs